In classical music, a string sextet is a composition written for six string instruments, or a group of six musicians who perform such a composition. Most string sextets have been written for an ensemble consisting of two violins, two violas, and two cellos.

Notable string sextets 
Among the earliest works in this form are the nine string sextets Op. 23 by Luigi Boccherini, written in 1776. Other notable string sextets include the String Sextets Op. 18 and 36 by Brahms, Dvořák's Op. 48, Tchaikovsky Souvenir de Florence, Op. 70, Schoenberg's Verklärte Nacht, Op. 4, Erich Wolfgang Korngold Op. 10, Erwin Schulhoff's String Sextet of 1924, and Charles Wuorinen's String Sextet of 1989.

Less usual combinations 
More unusual combinations for a string sextet:

 three violins, viola and two cellos: Ferdinand David (1810–1873), op. 38, Gaetano Brunetti (1744–1798), op. 1, Eugene Goossens (1893–1962), op. 37
 three violins, two violas and cello: Jan Brandts Buys (1868–1933), op. 40
 two violins, two violas, cello, double bass: Ignaz Pleyel (1757–1831) B.271, and others
 two violins, viola, two cellos, double bass: including works by Auguste Franchomme (1808–1884) and Ignacy Feliks Dobrzyński (1807–1867)

Selected list of string sextets 

 Luigi Boccherini (1743–1805) String Sextets, Op. 23 (1776)
 Alexander Borodin (1833–1887) String Sextet in D minor (2 movements) (1860/61)
 Hakon Børresen (1876–1954) Sextet in G major, Op. 5 (1901)
 Johannes Brahms (1833–1897)
 String Sextet No. 1 in B-flat major, Op. 18 (33')
 String Sextet No. 2 in G major, Op. 36 (33')
 Frank Bridge (1879–1941) String Sextet (1906–1912) (27')
 Karl Davydov (1838–1889) Sextet, Op. 35 (1880) dedicated to Leopold Auer
 Ignacy Feliks Dobrzyński (1807–67) Sextet in E-flat major, Op.39  (1845) (for 2 violins, viola, 2 cellos & bass)
 Ernő Dohnányi (1877–1960) String Sextet in B-flat major (1893, revised 1898)   (27')
 Antonín Dvořák (1841–1904) String Sextet in A major, Op. 48, B. 80  (31')
 Iván Erőd (1936–2019)
 Serenade for string sextet, Op. 45 (1983)
 2nd String Sextet, Op. 68  (1996)
 Eduard Franck (1817–1893)
 String Sextet No. 1 in E-flat, Op. 41  (1882)
 String Sextet No. 2 in D major, Op. 50  (1894)
 Niels Gade (1871–1890) Sextet in E-flat major, Op. 44  (1865)
 Louis Glass (1864–1936) Sextet in G major, Op. 15 (1893)
 Reinhold Glière (1875–1956)
 Sextet No. 1 in C minor (1898)
 String Sextet No. 2 in B minor, Op. 7 (1904)
 String Sextet No. 3 in C major, Op. 11 (1904)
 Heinrich Hofmann (1842–1902) Sextet Op. 25 (1874)
 Joseph Holbrooke (1878–1958) Sextet in D, Op. 43 (1924)
 Vincent d'Indy (1851–1931) String Sextet in B-flat major, Op. 92 (1927)
 Mauricio Kagel (1931–2008) String Sextet (1953, rev. 1957)
 Hans von Koessler (1853–1926) Sextet in F minor (1902)
 Erich Wolfgang Korngold (1897–1957) String Sextet in D major, Op. 10 (1917) (33')
 Arnold Krug (1849–1904) Sextet in D major, Op. 68
 Max Lewandowsky (1874–1906) Sextet, Op. 5 (1904)
 Bohuslav Martinů (1890–1959) String Sextet, H. 224   Paris, 1932  (15-16')
 Mihály Mosonyi (1815–1870) String Sextet in C minor  (32')
 Per August Ölander (1824–1886)  String Sextet  (1876?)
 Walter Piston (1894–1976) String Sextet (1964)  (18')
 Joachim Raff (1822–1882) Sextet in G minor, Op. 178   (1872)
 Max Reger (1873–1916) Sextet in F major, Op. 118 (1910)
 Friedhelm Rentzsch (born 1955) String Sextet  (1981)  (15')
 Nikolai Rimsky-Korsakov (1844–1908) String Sextet in A major  (30')
 Paul Rosenbloom (born 1952) String Sextet (1978) (30')
 Anton Rubinstein (1829–1894) Sextet in D major, Op. 97
 Peter Schickele (born 1935) String Sextet (1990) (26')
 Arnold Schoenberg (1874–1951) Verklärte Nacht (Transfigured Night), Op. 4 (1899)  (29')
 Erwin Schulhoff (1894–1942) String Sextet (1924) (21')
 Salvatore Sciarrino (born 1947) Sestetto (2003) (22')
 Louis Spohr (1784–1859) String Sextet in C major, Op. 140 (1848) (24')
 Richard Strauss (1864–1949) from the Opera Capriccio, Op. 85 (1942)  (10')
 Pyotr Ilyich Tchaikovsky (1840–1893) Souvenir de Florence, Op. 70   (35')
 Graham Waterhouse (born 1962) String Sextet op. 1 (1979–2013)
  (1834–1911) Sextet in B minor, Op. 27  (1898)
 Ermanno Wolf-Ferrari (1876–1948) Sextet in C minor (1894-5)
 Charles Wuorinen (1938–2020) String Sextet (1989)

See also 
String sextet repertoire
Sextet
String trio
String quartet
String quintet
String octet

References

Further reading 
 The New Grove Dictionary of Music and Musicians ed. S. Sadie (London: Macmillan, 1980)
 Naxos Music Library (www.NaxosMusicLibrary.com)

Chamber music
 
Types of musical groups